Hong Soon-hwa (born 3 June 1968) is a former international table tennis player from South Korea.

Table tennis career
She won three medals for South Korea at the World Table Tennis Championships in the Corbillon Cup (women's team event).

She represented South Korea during the 1992 Olympic Games.

See also
 List of World Table Tennis Championships medalists

References

South Korean female table tennis players
1968 births
Asian Games medalists in table tennis
Table tennis players at the 1990 Asian Games
Medalists at the 1990 Asian Games
Asian Games silver medalists for South Korea
Living people
World Table Tennis Championships medalists
Olympic table tennis players of South Korea
Table tennis players at the 1992 Summer Olympics
20th-century South Korean women